Yisrael Noah Weinberg (February 16, 1930 – February 5, 2009) was an Orthodox rabbi and the founder of Aish HaTorah.

Early life
Noah Weinberg was born on the Lower East Side of New York City. His father, Yitzchak Mattisyahu Weinberg was a Slonimer Hasid, and a grandson of the first Slonimer Rebbe, Avrohom Weinberg. His mother, Hinda, was a direct descendant of Jacob ben Jacob Moses of Lissa. Weinberg studied at Yeshiva Rabbi Chaim Berlin in Brooklyn and at Yeshivas Ner Yisroel in Baltimore, where he received his semikhah (rabbinic ordination). He completed his undergraduate studies at Johns Hopkins University and his post-graduate studies at Loyola Graduate School.

Career 
In 1953, Weinberg traveled to Israel to consult with the Chazon Ish regarding the response needed to counter the threat of assimilation in the Jewish world. However, the Chazon Ish died while Weinberg was en route to Israel.

As part of his job working as a salesman for his brother's company, Weinberg traveled to many small cities in the United States. During these trips, he encountered Jews of all kinds who were distant from their heritage.

Aish HaTorah 
In 1966, Weinberg decided to enter the field of kiruv (Orthodox Judaism outreach), and he opened the first yeshiva in this style for Jewish men in Jerusalem. The school was short-lived, as were several other attempts, before he co-founded Yeshivas Shma Yisrael (later renamed Ohr Somayach) in 1970 with Nota Schiller, Mendel Weinbach and Yaakov Rosenberg .  

After a few years, Weinberg broke away from the partnership over a difference in educational philosophy. He believed that the times called for the call up of "kiruv soldiers"people who would be given a few years of basic education training, and then sent out to give introductory classes to other young Jews at risk of assimilation and intermarriage. Weinberg established Aish HaTorah with five students in a small apartment in Jerusalem's Old City in 1974. In addition to its Jerusalem headquarters, Weinberg helped establish an Aish HaTorah branch in St. Louis in 1979. The organization later grew to 30 branches worldwide.

In 1985, Weinberg launched the Discovery Seminar, a multi-day seminar designed to introduce proofs of God's existence to audiences all over the world. The organization claims that the seminar has been presented to over 100,000 people worldwide. That same year, Weinberg launched the Jerusalem Fellowships, which brought college age Jewish people to Israel.

In 2001, Weinberg founded the Hasbara Fellowships program to bring university students to Israel for an intensive two-week Israel activism training course.

In recognition of Aish HaTorah, the Israeli government awarded Weinberg the last two building sites adjacent to the Western Wall. In 1996, he dedicated his newly designed yeshiva as the central location for Aish HaTorah's manpower and leadership training programs.

Personal life
Weinberg married Denah Goldman, and established their first home in the Mea Shearim neighborhood of Jerusalem. In 1967, they moved into a new apartment in the Kiryat Sanz neighborhood. His older brother Yaakov was rosh yeshiva of Yeshivas Ner Yisroel in Baltimore. His nephew, son of his sister Chava Leah, was Shimshon Dovid Pincus.

Death 
Weinberg was diagnosed with lung cancer in 2007. He died on February 5, 2009.

Weinberg left behind his wife Denah, 12 children and more than 100 grandchildren and great-grandchildren.

Works
Weinberg created new curricula to teach the fundamentals of Jewish belief and practice to Jews. These include:
 "The 48 Ways to Wisdom"
 "The 6 Constant Mitzvot"
 "Foundations"
 "The 5 Levels of Pleasure"

Books
 48 Ways to Wisdom  (co-authored with Shraga Simmons and Nechemia Coopersmith; Artscroll)
 What the Angel Taught You: Seven Keys to Life Fulfillment (co-authored with Yaakov Salomon; Artscroll) 
 The 5 Levels of Pleasure: Enlightened Decision Making for Success in Life (SelectBooks)
 Wisdom for Living (Nechemia Coopersmith; Artscroll)

References

1930 births
2009 deaths
20th-century rabbis in Jerusalem
21st-century rabbis in Jerusalem
Rabbis of Aish HaTorah
American emigrants to Israel
Haredi rabbis in Israel
Rabbis from New York City
Rosh yeshivas
Rabbis of Ohr Somayach
Aish HaTorah
Burials at Har HaMenuchot
Slonim (Hasidic dynasty)
Yeshivas Ner Yisroel